The Socialist Party of Thailand (SPT) was a political party in Thailand, active in the 1970s. SPT was led by its general secretary Boonsanong Punyodyana.

SPT won 15 out of 269 seats in the 1975 parliamentary elections.

Boonsanong Punyodyana was murdered on 28 February 1976. Around 10,000 people attended his memorial service.

After the Thammasat University massacre on 6 October 1976, many SPT cadre went into exile or joined the Communist Party of Thailand's guerrillas in the border areas with Laos in northern Thailand and Isan (northeastern Thailand). Thus the party was dissolved at the order of National Administrative Reform Council leader Sangad Chaloryu on 6 October 1976.

References

Defunct political parties in Thailand
Socialist parties in Asia
Political parties disestablished in 1976
Socialist parties in Thailand
1976 disestablishments in Thailand